Chrysodeixis heberachis is a moth of the family Noctuidae. It is found in Taiwan and Ishigaki Island (Japan).

External links
Chrysodeixis at funet
Photo Adult

Plusiinae
Moths of Japan
Moths of Taiwan
Moths described in 1920